Nikolaki Sawaf (born 8 February 1943 in Aleppo, Syria) is the former archbishop of the Melkite Greek Catholic Archeparchy of Latakia from 2000 to 2021.

Life

Nikolaki Sawaf was on April 15, 1968 ordained priest. On 14 January 2000, Sawaf was appointed and succeeded Fares Maakaroun as Archbishop of Latakia. Archbishop Boulos Nassif Borkhoche of Bosra and Hauran consecrated him as bishop and his co-consecrators were Archbishop Jean-Clément Jeanbart of Aleppo and Archbishop Fares Maakaroun of Nossa Senhora do Paraíso em São Paulo in Brazil on March 4, 2000.

References

External links
 http://www.catholic-hierarchy.org/bishop/bsawaf.html

1943 births
Melkite Greek Catholic bishops
21st-century Eastern Catholic archbishops
Living people
20th-century Eastern Catholic clergy
20th-century Syrian people
21st-century Syrian people
People from Aleppo
Syrian Melkite Greek Catholics
Eastern Catholic bishops in Syria